Harry "Machine Gun" Kelly (born 1961) is an American former basketball player. He played college basketball for the Texas Southern Tigers from 1979–1983.

College career
Kelly was born in Jackson, Mississippi. He enrolled at Texas Southern University in 1979, and played basketball for the team for four seasons. A counselor gave him his nickname "Machine Gun Kelly" in his freshman year due to his prolific scoring; in his college career he scored 3,066 points — the sixth most in NCAA Division I history — and averaged 27.9 points per game. In addition, he achieved a career total of 1,085 rebounds, averaging 9.9 per game, making him the first player to score over 3,000 points and grab 1,000 rebounds in NCAA history. He was named Southwestern Athletic Conference Player of the Year three times and received the John McLendon Award, which honors the best player at a historically black college, in 1982 and 1983.

Professional career
Kelly was selected in the fourth round of the 1983 NBA Draft by the Atlanta Hawks. He was cut from the team before the season in favor of Doc Rivers, Randy Wittman and center John Pinone, who were all selected before him. He subsequently played briefly in California's Summer Pro League and Italy's Lega Basket Serie A. In 1984 he started a career in Houston's Department of Public Works and Engineering.

See also
 List of NCAA Division I men's basketball players with 60 or more points in a game
 List of NCAA Division I men's basketball players with 2000 points and 1000 rebounds
 List of NCAA Division I men's basketball career scoring leaders
 List of NCAA Division I men's basketball season scoring leaders

References

1961 births
Living people
African-American basketball players
American expatriate basketball people in Italy
American men's basketball players
Atlanta Hawks draft picks
Basketball players from Jackson, Mississippi
Small forwards
Texas Southern Tigers men's basketball players
21st-century African-American people
20th-century African-American sportspeople